A list of films produced by the Marathi language film industry based in Maharashtra in the year 1966.

1966 Releases
A list of Marathi films released in 1966.

References

Lists of 1966 films by country or language
 Marathi
1966